Babette Deutsch (September 22, 1895 – November 13, 1982) was an American poet, critic, translator, and novelist.

Background
Babette Deutsch was born on September 22, 1895, in New York City.  Her parents were of Michael Deutsch and Melanie Fisher Deutsch.  She matriculated from the Ethical Culture School and Barnard College, graduating in 1917 with a B.A. She published poems in magazines such as the North American Review and the New Republic while she was still a student at Barnard.

Career
During the 1940s, 1950s and into the 1960s, Deutsch was teaching at Columbia University, where her students included poet/publisher Lawrence Ferlinghetti. In 1946, she received an honorary D. Litt. from Columbia University.

Deutsch translated Pushkin's Eugene Onegin into English and also made some of the best English versions of Boris Pasternak's poems. Deutsch's own poems displayed what poet Marianne Moore called "her commanding stature as a poet."

Personal life and death
On April 29, 1921, Deutsch married Avrahm Yarmolinsky, chief of the Slavonic Division of The New York Public Library (1918–1955), also a writer and translator. They had two sons, Adam and Michael.

Babette Deutsch died age 87 on November 13, 1982.

Works

Poetic collections
 Banners (1919, George H. Doran)
 Honey Out of the Rock (1925, B. Appleton)
 Fire for the Night (1930, Jonathan Cape & Harrison Smith)
 Epistle to Prometheus (1931, Jonathan Cape & Harrison Smith)
 One Part Love (1939, Oxford University Press)
 Take Them, Stranger (1944, Henry Holt)
 Animal, Vegetable, Mineral (1954, E.P. Dutton)
 Coming of Age: New & selected poems (1959, Indiana University Press)
 Collected Poems, 1919–1962 (1963, Indiana University Press)
 The Collected Poems of Babette Deutsch (1969, Doubleday & Co.)

Novels
 A Brittle Heaven (1926, Greenberg)
 In Such A Night (1927, Martin Secker)
 Mask of Silenus: A Novel About Socrates (1933, Simon and Schuster)
 Rogue's Legacy: A Novel About Francois Villon (1942, Coward-McCann)

Other works
 Potable Gold: Some Notes on Poetry and This Age (1929, W. W. Norton)
 This Modern Poetry (1936, Faber & Faber)
 Walt Whitman: Builder for America (1941, Julian Messner)
 The Reader's Shakespeare (1946, Julian Messner)
 Poetry Handbook (1957, Funk & Wagnalls)
 Poetry in Our Time (1958, Columbia University Press)
 Poems – Samuel Taylor Coleridge, ed. Babette Deutsch, illus. Jacques Hnizkovsky (1967, Thomas Cromwell)

Translations from Russian
 Modern Russian Poetry: an Anthology – trans. by Babette Deutsch and Avrahm Yarmolinsky (1921, John Lane)
 Contemporary German Poetry: an Anthology – trans. by Babette Deutsch and Avrahm Yarmolinsky (1923, Harcourt Brace & Co.)
 Eugene Onegin – Alexander Pushkin, illus. Fritz Eichenberg (1939, Heritage Society)
 Heroes of the Kalevala – illus. Fritz Eichenberg (1940, Julian Messner)
 Poems from the Book of Hours – Rainer Maria Rilke (1941, New Directions)
 Selected Poems – Adam Mickiewicz, trans. Babetted Deutsch (alongside W. H. Auden, Louise Bogan, Rolfe Humphries and Robert Hillyer) (1955, The Noonday Press)
 Two Centuries of Russian Verse – trans. Babette Deutsch and Avrahm Yarmolinsky (1966, Random House)

Children's books
 Crocodile – Korney Chukovsky, trans. Babette Deutsch (1931, J. Lippincott)
 It's A Secret! – illus. Dorothy Bayley (1941, Harper & Bros.)
 The Welcome – illus. Marc Simont (1942, Harper & Bros.)
 The Steel Flea – Nikolas Leskov, trans. Babette Deutsch and Avrahm Yarmolinsky, illus. Mstislav Dobufinsky (1943, Harper & Row) – revised 1964, illus. by Janina Domanska
 Tales of Faraway Folk – trans. Babette Deutsch and Avrahm Yarmolinsky, illus. Irena Lorentowicz (1952, Harper & Row)
 More Tales of Faraway Folk – trans. Babette Deutsch and Avrahm Yarmolinsky, illus. Janina Domanska (1963, Harper & Row)
 I Often Wish (1966, Funk & Wagnalls)

References

External links
 
 
 Babette Deutsch at FactMonster
 Babette Deutsch in The Columbia Electronic Encyclopedia at GeoCities.com
 Babette Deutsch at The Literary Encyclopaedia (subscription required) – no text as of 2016-07-17
 Penguin Translators A–G at Penguin First Editions – one book translated by Deutsch as of 2016-07-17 
 

1895 births
1982 deaths
20th-century American novelists
Barnard College alumni
American women poets
Russian–English translators
American literary critics
Women literary critics
American women novelists
20th-century American women writers
20th-century American poets
Women anthologists
20th-century American translators
Journalists from New York City
Novelists from New York (state)
American women non-fiction writers
20th-century American non-fiction writers
American women critics
Members of the American Academy of Arts and Letters